Edith Frost (born August 18, 1964) is an American singer-songwriter who describes her music as "pensive countrified psychedelia".

Born in San Antonio, Texas, Frost moved to Brooklyn in 1990 where she played in the country bands The Holler Sisters, The Marfa Lights, and Edith and Her Roadhouse Romeos.

In 1996, she moved to Chicago after signing to the city's Drag City label, which released her demo as a self-titled EP. A second EP, Ancestors, followed in 1997.

Her debut album Calling Over Time was released in 1997, and featured Jim O'Rourke, David Grubbs, and Sean O'Hagan of Stereolab and the High Llamas.  This was followed by Telescopic in 1998, which was produced by Neil Hagerty and Jennifer Herrema from the band Royal Trux.

In 2001 she released Wonder Woman, which was engineered by Steve Albini, and the more sparse sounding It's a Game was released in 2005.

In 2014 she relocated to Austin and in the following year self-released the EP Nothing Comes Around, her first new music in fifteen years.

Discography
Studio albums
Calling Over Time (1997, Drag City)
Telescopic (1998, Drag City)
Wonder Wonder (2001, Drag City)
It's a Game (2005, Drag City)

EPs
Edith Frost (1996, Drag City)
Ancestors (1997)
Love Is Real (1999, Drag City)
Nothing Comes Around (2015, self-released)

Compilations
Demos (2004, Comfort Stand)

References

External links
 Official website
 Edith Frost at MySpace
 Edith Frost at Drag City (record company) 
 [ Edith Frost] at Allmusic
 mp3 Demos at Comfortstand (netlabel)

1964 births
Living people
American alternative country singers
American women country singers
American country singer-songwriters
Musicians from San Antonio
Drag City (record label) artists
Musical groups established in 1996
Singer-songwriters from Texas
Country musicians from Texas
21st-century American women